Spatsizi Headwaters Provincial Park is a provincial park in the Stikine Region of British Columbia, Canada. It was established on January 25, 2001 to protect the headwaters of the Spatsizi River while providing recreational facilities for visitors.

Geography
The park is located just east of Mount Gunanoot in the Skeena Mountains of north-central British Columbia. Here the river emerges out from the mountains to flow north through the park and on toward Spatsizi Plateau Wilderness Provincial Park.

The headwaters of the Spatsizi River is located in the traditional territory of the Tahltan First Nation.

See also
Sacred Headwaters

References

External links

Provincial parks of British Columbia
Stikine Country
Stikine Plateau
Protected areas established in 2001
2001 establishments in British Columbia